The Gitxsan Treaty Society handles Treaty negotiations in the BC Treaty Process for a number of First Nations in northwestern British Columbia

Treaty Process

The Gitxsan Treaty Society has reached Stage 4 in the BC Treaty Process.

Membership
Gitanmaax Band Council
Gitsegukla Indian Band (formerly Kitsegugkla)
Gitwangak Band Council (also Kitwanga)
Glen Vowell Indian Band
Kispiox Band Council

See also
List of tribal councils in British Columbia

References

First Nations organizations in British Columbia
Skeena Country
Gitxsan